Parmly is a surname. Notable people with the surname include:

Eleazer Parmly (1797–1874), American dentist
Jahial Parmly Paret (1870–1952), American tennis player and writer
Michael E. Parmly (born 1951), American diplomat

See also
Parly (surname)